Barville is a commune in the Eure department in northern France.

Population

See also
Communes of the Eure department

References

External links

Monuments to the family of de Livet de Barville 
Marquis de Livet de Barville 
Marquis de Livet 
Genealogy of Livet de Barville, Auguste de le Prevost, 1862 
Guillaume de Livet, Canon, Rouen Cathedral, judge at the trial of Joan of Arc
de Livet de Barville, Dictionnaire de la Noblesse, Francois Alexandre Aubert de La Chesnaye-Desbois, 1775 

Communes of Eure